Nancy Lee Owen (born May 2, 1943) is an American former volleyball player. She played for the United States national team at the 1963 Pan American Games, the 1964 Summer Olympics, the 1967 Pan American Games, and the 1968 Summer Olympics. She was born in Cleveland, Ohio and first became interested in volleyball after her physical education teacher introduced her to the sport.

Personal life
Owen grew up in southern California, where she received training in volleyball. Her training was the main driving force behind the move and her family was supportive of her training.

After retiring Owen began working as a national speaker and representative for the sport of volleyball. Owen currently lives in Nampa, Idaho with her husband.

College coaching career
After competing in the Olympics Owen began working as a coach for the California State University volleyball team. During her time as coach she led the team to several wins and in 1986 led the team to win the West Coast Conference Championship. The team also earned the first NCAA tournament in West Coast Conference history in 1986 and during that same year Owen was named the WCC Coach of the Year.

References

1943 births
Living people
Olympic volleyball players of the United States
Volleyball players at the 1964 Summer Olympics
Volleyball players at the 1968 Summer Olympics
Volleyball players at the 1963 Pan American Games
Volleyball players at the 1967 Pan American Games
Pan American Games gold medalists for the United States
Pan American Games silver medalists for the United States
Sportspeople from Cleveland
American women's volleyball players
Pan American Games medalists in volleyball
Medalists at the 1963 Pan American Games
Medalists at the 1967 Pan American Games
21st-century American women
Pepperdine Waves women's volleyball players
Long Beach State Beach women's volleyball players